Alejandro Ramírez may refer to:

 Alejandro Ramírez (economist) (1777–1821), Spanish economist
 Alejandro Ramírez (chess player) (born 1988), chess grandmaster from Costa Rica
 Alejandro Ramírez (cyclist) (born 1981), Colombian cyclist
 Alejandro Ramírez (volleyball) (born 1983), Mexican volleyball player
 Alejandro Ramírez (Peruvian footballer) (born 1991), Peruvian footballer